Julius the Cat is a cartoon animal character created in 1922 by Walt Disney and Ub Iwerks. He first appeared in the very first animated series created by Walt Disney, the Alice Comedies, making him the predecessor of Oswald the Lucky Rabbit and Mickey Mouse. Julius is an anthropomorphic cat, appearing intentionally similar to Felix the Cat. A bold and inventive hero, he gradually became the primary focus of the Alice Comedies, to the point Disney abandoned live action for pure animation on subsequent projects.

Julius was the first of Disney's animated protagonists to battle Pete, their oldest continuing character.

The two "Julius Katz" stores on Buena Vista Street in Disney California Adventure are named in his honor.

History 

The character first appeared (nameless) in eight of the ten animated shorts created by Disney's first studio effort, Laugh-O-Gram Studio, the last of these being the pilot of the Alice Comedies, Alice's Wonderland. After a trial run as "Mike" (in Alice the Peacemaker), he would receive his permanent name of Julius in Alice's Egg Plant, making him Walt Disney's first named animated character. The primary motivation for the creation of the character was that Charles Mintz wanted to have the greatest possible visual gags in the series. Since the young Alice, first played by Virginia Davis, then only seven years old, could not be relied on for the comic role, she needed a partner, and Julius the Cat filled that role. Throughout the course of the Alice series, the animated Julius was increasingly made the central focus, over the live action Alice.

In one of his first appearances, Alice's Fishy Story, Julius' tail demonstrates its great versatility, a recurring characteristic in the series. Walt repeatedly played on the mythology of cats having nine lives. In the short film Alice the Peacemaker, he is partnered with a mouse named Ike (a forerunner to Mickey Mouse). This cat/mouse pairing was one of many famous animated duos from Krazy Kat (and Ignatz) through Tom and Jerry and Itchy and Scratchy. Julius was the first of Disney's animated characters to be antagonized by Pete, beginning in Alice Solves the Puzzle. He would later box him in Alice Picks the Champ.

He has occasionally appeared in Disney comics under the name "Mio Miao" in Italian and "Otto" in Swedish.

Character 
Julius was bold, resourceful and ingenious, playing the role of the hero, frequently rescuing damsel-in-distress Alice. He often used his prehensile tail to his advantage, as a crane, unicycle, ladder, or other useful tool. Ub Iwerks' unique animation style resulted in smooth, fluid movement.

Similarity to Felix 
In the early days of animation, Felix the Cat, who was created on November 9, 1919, by Otto Messmer for Pat Sullivan's studio, was the template for a successful animated character. Julius' similarity to Felix was not accidental, but due to Margaret Winkler urging the reluctant Disney to copy him. She had been the distributor for Felix the Cat, but was constantly fighting with Sullivan, eventually leading to a split, so she turned to Disney to fill the void. Like Felix, Julius would pace and detach his tail. When he was in a quandary, visible question marks would form over his head. The New York Times went so far as to call Julius a "blatant clone... from the rubber-hose-and-circle design to the detachable body parts."

Legacy 

Many of the individual Alice Comedies films have been re-released, in packages like Disney Rarities: Celebrated Shorts: 1920s–1960s and Walt Disney Treasures: The Adventures of Oswald the Lucky Rabbit. The Mickey Mouse cartoon Runaway Brain also features a character who, though visually modeled after Pete, is named Julius.

Disney California Adventure's Julius Katz Shoe & Watch Repair and Julius Katz & Sons Appliance Repair stores on Buena Vista Street are named after Julius.

Filmography
[[File:Jack the Giant Killer (1922).webm|thumb|thumbtime=2|upright=1.5|Jack the Giant Killer]]
The Julius character appeared in 49 of the 57 films of the Alice Comedies series.

1922
 Little Red Riding Hood (anonymous appearance)
 The Four Musicians of Bremen Jack and the Beanstalk Jack the Giant Killer Goldie Locks and the Three Bears Puss in Boots Cinderella1923
 Jack and the Beanstalk Alice's Wonderland (anonymous appearance; work unfinished at studio bankruptcy)

1924
 Alice's Day at Sea Alice's Spooky Adventure Alice's Fishy Story Alice the Peacemaker (named Mike; name not used again)
 Alice Hunting in Africa Alice and the Three Bears Alice the Piper1925
 Alice Cans the Cannibals Alice the Toreador Alice Gets Stung Alice Solves the Puzzle (first appearance of Pete)
 Alice's Egg Plant (named Julius)
 Alice Loses Out Alice Wins the Derby Alice Picks the Champ Alice's Tin Pony Alice Chops the Suey Alice the Jail Bird Alice Plays Cupid Alice in the Jungle 1926 
 Alice on the Farm Alice's Balloon Race Alice's Orphan Alice's Little Parade Alice's Mysterious Mystery Alice Charms the Fish Alice's Monkey Business Alice in the Wooly West Alice the Fire Fighter Alice Cuts the Ice Alice Helps the Romance Alice's Spanish Guitar Alice's Brown Derby Alice the LumberJack1927
 Alice the Golf Bug Alice Foils the Pirates Alice at the Carnival Alice at the Rodeo Alice the Collegiate Alice's Auto Race Alice's Circus Daze Alice's Knaughty Knight Alice's Three Bad Eggs Alice's Channel Swim Alice in the Klondike Alice's Medicine Show Alice the Whaler Alice the Beach NutBook appearances

1931
Topolino

See also
 Figaro, the small tuxedo cat that first appears in Disney's Pinocchio (1940)
 Animation in the United States during the silent era
 Golden age of American animation
 Epic Mickey''

References 

Alice Comedies
Anthropomorphic cats
Disney core universe characters
Film characters introduced in 1922
Fictional mute characters
Articles containing video clips
Animated characters introduced in 1922